Bucculatrix sinevi is a moth in the family Bucculatricidae. It was described by Svetlana Seksjaeva in 1988. It is found in Japan (Hokkaido) and the Russian Far East.

The wingspan is 7–8 mm. The forewings are creamy white with some dark fuscous irrorations. The hindwings are grey.

References

External links
 Natural History Museum Lepidoptera generic names catalog

Bucculatricidae
Moths described in 1988
Moths of Japan
Moths of Asia